Oakland, California began a program of designating the city's historic landmarks and properties starting in 1973. Many of the properties have also received recognition at the federal level by inclusion on the National Register of Historic Places or by designation as National Historic Landmarks.

Oakland Designated Landmarks

Preservation Districts

Heritage properties

See also

 California Historical Landmarks in Alameda County, California
 National Register of Historic Places listings in Alameda County

Notes

References

Locally designated landmarks in the United States
Landmarks
Oakland
Oakland